Julio Terrazas Sandoval (March 7, 1936 – December 9, 2015) was a Cardinal Priest and Archbishop Emeritus of the Roman Catholic Archdiocese of Santa Cruz de la Sierra in the Roman Catholic Church.

Biography
Born in Vallegrande, Bolivia, Terrazas Sandoval was ordained a priest in 1962. He earned a degree in social ministry in France. In Bolivia, he was superior of the Vallegrande Redemptorist community before being appointed Auxiliary of La Paz in 1978. He was later transferred to Oruro in 1982. He chaired the Episcopal Commission on the Laity, Youth and Vocations, was a member of CELAM's Commission on the Laity, and was elected President of the Bolivian Episcopal Conference on several occasions.

Appointed Archbishop of Santa Cruz in 1991, Terrazas Sandoval was made a Cardinal by Pope John Paul II on 21 February 2001. He was one of the cardinal electors who participated in the 2005 papal conclave that selected Pope Benedict XVI, and also one of the cardinal electors who participated in the 2013 papal conclave that selected Pope Francis.

On May 25, 2013, Pope Francis accepted the resignation he submitted when he turned 75. He was immediately succeeded as Archbishop of Santa Cruz de la Sierra by his Coadjutor Archbishop, Sergio Alfredo Gualberti Calandrina.

Terrazas died at age of 79 after several complications in his health.

References

External links

 Biography at catholic-pages.com

1936 births
2015 deaths
Bolivian cardinals
Bolivian Roman Catholic archbishops
Cardinals created by Pope John Paul II
People from Vallegrande Province
Redemptorist cardinals
Roman Catholic archbishops of Santa Cruz de la Sierra
Roman Catholic bishops of La Paz
Roman Catholic bishops of Oruro